HMS Tantalus was a British submarine of the third group of the T class. She was built as P318 by Vickers Armstrong, Barrow, and launched on 24 February 1943. So far she has been the only ship of the Royal Navy to bear the name Tantalus, after the mythological Tantalus, son of Zeus.

Service
Tantalus served in the Far East for much of her wartime career. She sank the Malaysian tug Kampung Besar, and the Malaysian Pulo Salanama in April 1944; she went on to sink the Japanese army cargo ships Amagi Maru and Hiyoshi Maru, the Japanese cargo ship Hachijin Maru, the Japanese coaster Palang Maru, the Japanese fishing vessel Taisei Maru No. 12, a Japanese tug and three barges, an unknown Japanese vessel, and a Siamese sailing vessel, whilst claiming to have damaged a second. Tantalus also damaged a tug and the Japanese submarine chaser Ch 1. She also attacked, but missed the Japanese submarine I-166, which was sunk later that day by HMS Telemachus.

Tantalus survived the war and continued in service with the Royal Navy, finally being scrapped at Milford Haven in November 1950.

References

External links
 IWM Interview with Hugh Mackenzie, who commanded HMS Tantalus from 1943 to 1945

 

British T-class submarines of the Royal Navy
Ships built in Barrow-in-Furness
1943 ships
World War II submarines of the United Kingdom
Cold War submarines of the United Kingdom